is a Japanese multimedia spin-off series of The Idolmaster, starting with the game of the same name. The series follows a new group of idols working alongside the idols of 765 Productions with a producer at the 765 Theater Agency.

The original game is a Japanese idol raising simulation video game developed and managed by Bandai Namco Entertainment released on the GREE social network platform February 27, 2013 for Android and iOS platforms and for feature phones. A rhythm game titled Idolmaster Million Live! Theater Days was released on June 29, 2017. The original game ended service on March 18, 2018, leaving Theater Days as the main game centered on Million Live. An anime television series adaptation by Shirogumi is scheduled to air in October 2023.

Overview

Million Live! introduces 37 idols, working alongside the 13 idols of 765 Production; Theater Days adds two more idols and a secretary. Compared to other spin-offs in the Idolmaster series, the new idols work with and interact with the idols of 765. The general design and much of the visual elements are done by A-1 Pictures, the same animation studio responsible for animating several of the Idolmaster anime series.

Gameplay

GREE game
The game was a free-to-play idol raising simulator in which the player, as the producer, trained idols and sent them to work in various locations while also making the idols 765 Production Theater bigger.  The idols were obtained through collecting cards ranked by rarity and divided into three categories, Vocal, Dance, and Visual, with a fourth category, Ex, reserved for special cards. Leveling up the cards made the idols stronger, with the higher rarities being able to reach higher levels.

The feature phone version was discontinued on February 2, 2016; a desktop client was released within the same month.
The GREE game was shut down on March 19, 2018.

Theater Days
A second game titled Idolmaster Million Live! Theater Days was released June 29, 2017 for Android and iOS platforms. It is a rhythm game and simulation game, with 3D models, periodically released story missions, and multiple choice 'communication' events with the idols in the vein of the original Idolmaster games.

Many of the cards from the original game are reused in Theater Days.

Media

Animations
Seven of the idols from Million Live are featured in the anime film The Idolmaster Movie: Beyond the Brilliant Future!.

Special animation videos for Million Live have been created as anniversary celebrations. The first animation, a video featuring Mirai Kasuga, was created for the first anniversary and streamed in-game. A 10-minute animation was created for its fourth anniversary. Both were animated by A-1 Pictures.

TV Anime
An anime television series adaptation of Million Live! was announced during the Theater Days 3rd anniversary livestream. It will be animated by Shirogumi and directed by Shinya Watada, with series composition and script by Yōichi Katō, character designs for animation by Tetsuya Ishii and Kaori Tsuta. It is scheduled to air in October 2023.

Comics
Aside from comics available alongside the games themselves, Million Live! has several published manga.

A manga titled Idolm@ster Million Live! was published in Monthly Shōnen Sunday from August 2014 to October 2016, created by author Yuki Monji and Bandai Namco Entertainment. The collected volume editions came with original CDs.

Music
Million Live has image songs published by Lantis (later a label for Bandai Namco's Bandai Namco Arts).

The music was integrated into the gameplay of Theater Days.

Sales of the CDs and concert Blu-rays had surpassed a combined one million units by 2017; the CD The@ter Generation 01 Brand New Theater! received a Gold certification from the RIAJ.

References

External links

 

2013 video games
2014 manga
2023 anime television series debuts
A-1 Pictures
Android (operating system) games
Bandai Namco games
Digital collectible card games
Free-to-play video games
IOS games
Japanese idols in anime and manga
Music in anime and manga
Shirogumi
Shōnen manga
Seinen manga
Million Live
Upcoming anime television series
Video games developed in Japan